Willem Frederik Faber (born 15 February 1968) is a South African businessman and politician who has been serving as a Member of the National Assembly since May 2019. He was a permanent delegate to the National Council of Provinces, the upper house of Parliament, from May 2009 to May 2019. Faber is a member of the Democratic Alliance (DA).

Career
Faber joined the Democratic Alliance and was a councillor of the Sol Plaatje Local Municipality, centred around Kimberley, the Northern Cape capital, for seven years.

From 2004 to 2009, Faber worked for the company Protech. In May 2009, he was elected as a permanent delegate to the National Council of Provinces, the upper house of parliament. He was one of six delegates from the Northern Cape. He was re-elected in 2014. Faber was elected to the lower house in May 2019, as he was placed second on the DA's national list for the general election. He was elected as a party whip when the caucus met to elect parliamentary leadership. As of June 2019, he serves as an Alternate Member of the Portfolio Committee on Sports, Arts and Culture.

Personal life
Faber resides in Warrenton, Northern Cape.

References

External links
Mr Willem Frederik Faber – People's Assembly

Living people
1968 births
Afrikaner people
People from the Northern Cape
Democratic Alliance (South Africa) politicians
Members of the National Assembly of South Africa
Members of the National Council of Provinces
People from Sol Plaatje Local Municipality